The 2012 European Men's and Women's Team Badminton Championships was held in Amsterdam, the Netherlands, from February 14 to February 19, 2012. This tournament also serves as European qualification for the 2012 Thomas & Uber Cup.

Medalists

Men's team

Final stage

Final

Women's team

Final stage

Final

References

External links
EMTC & EMWC 2012 - Tournament Software

European Men's and Women's Team Badminton Championships
European Men's and Women's Team Badminton Championships
Badminton tournaments in the Netherlands
International sports competitions hosted by the Netherlands
2012 in Dutch sport